The Age of Bronze is a bronze statue by the French sculptor Auguste Rodin (1840–1917). The figure is of a life-size nude male, 72 in. (182.9 cm) high. Rodin continued to produce casts of the statue for several decades after it was modelled in 1876.

Rodin had a Belgian soldier pose for the statue, keeping photographs which survive (in the Rodin Museum). The pose partly derives from Michelangelo's Dying Slave in the Louvre Museum, which has the elbow raised above the head.

History
When the statue was first exhibited at the 1877 Salon in Paris, France, Rodin was falsely accused of having made the statue by casting a living model, a charge that was vigorously denied. This charge benefited Rodin, though, because people were so eager to see this for themselves.

Casts
Casts of the statue can be found in many museums, including:

Gallery

See also

List of sculptures by Auguste Rodin
1877 in art

References

Bibliography
 Le Normand-Romain, Antoinette; Judrin, Claude; Vassalo, I. (1997).  Vers l'âge d'airain, Rodin en Belgique: Exposition.  Paris: Musée Rodin editions.  .

External links
 The Age of Bronze, Analysis and Critical Reception
 The Age of Bronze at the Musée Rodin
 The Age of Bronze at the Metropolitan Museum of Art

1877 sculptures
Sculptures of the Metropolitan Museum of Art
Sculptures of the Musée d'Orsay
Collections of the National Gallery of Canada
Sculptures of the Victoria and Albert Museum
Sculptures of the Museum of Fine Arts of Lyon
Sculptures by Auguste Rodin
Sculptures of the Musée Rodin
Sculptures of the Alte Nationalgalerie
Age
Metalwork of the Metropolitan Museum of Art
Sculptures of the Cleveland Museum of Art
Collections of the National Gallery of Art
Collections of the Nationalmuseum Stockholm
Sculptures of the Ny Carlsberg Glyptotek